At the 1908 Summer Olympics held in London, England, 26 athletics events were contested, all for men only. A total of 79 medals (27 gold, 27 silver, 25 bronze) were awarded.

Each nation was allowed to enter up to 12 competitors in most of the events.  In the team races (the medley relay and the 3 mile team race), each nation entered one team.  The medley relay was run by four athletes, with four alternates allowed.  In the 3 mile team race, five athletes from each nation ran with only three counting.

The competition was restricted to amateurs, and was held under the rules of the British Amateur Athletic Association.

Medal summary

Medal table

Events
The 1908 Games were the first to feature race walking, with two different events held.  Two different forms of javelin throwing also appeared, introducing the new throwing apparatus to the programme.  The 60 metre short sprint was dropped from the programme, as was the middle hurdle distance.  Steeplechasing was done at 3200 metres instead of the 2500 metres that had been included at the previous two editions; the team race also had its distance shortened.  A short track relay event was added.  The multi-discipline triathlon and decathlon events that had been held at the 1904 Games were both absent.  An event featuring the discus, which had become a staple of Olympic athletics, was held in which throwers had to follow a very specific throwing style.  Overall there was one more event on the 1908 programme than there had been in 1904.

Calendar

|-
|bgcolor=#3399ff|   ●   || Event competitions
|bgcolor=#ffcc00|   ●   || Event finals
|-

|-
! July ||width=30| 13th ||width=30| 14th ||width=30| 15th ||width=30| 16th ||width=30| 17th ||width=30| 18th ||width=30| 19th ||width=30| 20th ||width=30| 21st ||width=30| 22nd ||width=30| 23rd ||width=30| 24th ||width=30| 25th
|- align=center
|align=left| 100 metres
| || || || || || || ||bgcolor=#3399ff| ● ||bgcolor=#3399ff| ● ||bgcolor=#ffcc00| ● || || ||
|- align=center
|align=left| 200 metres
| || || || || || || || ||bgcolor=#3399ff| ● ||bgcolor=#3399ff| ● ||bgcolor=#ffcc00| ● || ||
|- align=center
|align=left| 400 metres
| || || || || || || || ||bgcolor=#3399ff| ● ||bgcolor=#3399ff| ● ||bgcolor=#ffcc00| ● || ||bgcolor=#ffcc00| ●
|- align=center
|align=left| 800 metres
| || || || || || || ||bgcolor=#3399ff| ● ||bgcolor=#ffcc00| ● || || || ||
|- align=center
|align=left| 1500 metres
|bgcolor=#3399ff| ● ||bgcolor=#ffcc00| ● || || || || || || || || || || ||
|- align=center
|align=left| 110 metres hurdles
| || || || || || || || || || ||bgcolor=#3399ff| ● ||bgcolor=#3399ff| ● ||bgcolor=#ffcc00| ●
|- align=center
|align=left| 400 metres hurdles
| || || || || || || ||bgcolor=#3399ff| ● ||bgcolor=#3399ff| ● ||bgcolor=#ffcc00| ● || || ||
|- align=center
|align=left| 3200 metres steeplechase
| || || || ||bgcolor=#3399ff| ● ||bgcolor=#ffcc00| ● || || || || || || ||
|- align=center
|align=left| Medley relay
| || || || || || || || || || || ||bgcolor=#3399ff| ● ||bgcolor=#ffcc00| ●
|- align=center
|align=left| 3 miles team race
| ||bgcolor=#3399ff| ● ||bgcolor=#ffcc00| ● || || || || || || || || || ||
|- align=center
|align=left| 5 miles
| || ||bgcolor=#3399ff| ● || || ||bgcolor=#ffcc00| ● || || || || || || ||
|- align=center
|align=left| marathon
| || || || || || || || || || || ||bgcolor=#ffcc00| ● ||
|- align=center
|align=left| 3500 metres walk
| ||bgcolor=#ffcc00| ● ● || || || || || || || || || || ||
|- align=center
|align=left| 10 miles walk
| || || ||bgcolor=#3399ff| ● ||bgcolor=#ffcc00| ● || || || || || || || ||
|- align=center
|align=left| Long jump
| || || || || || || || || ||bgcolor=#ffcc00| ● || || ||
|- align=center
|align=left| Triple jump
| || || || || || || || || || || || ||bgcolor=#ffcc00| ●
|- align=center
|align=left| High jump
| || || || || || || || ||bgcolor=#ffcc00| ● || || || ||
|- align=center
|align=left| Pole vault
| || || || || || || || || || || ||bgcolor=#ffcc00| ● ||
|- align=center
|align=left| Standing long jump
| || || || || || || ||bgcolor=#ffcc00| ● || || || || ||
|- align=center
|align=left| Standing high jump
| || || || || || || || || || ||bgcolor=#ffcc00| ● || ||
|- align=center
|align=left| Shot put
| || || ||bgcolor=#ffcc00| ● || || || || || || || || ||
|- align=center
|align=left| Discus throw
| || || ||bgcolor=#ffcc00| ● || || || || || || || || ||
|- align=center
|align=left| Hammer throw
| ||bgcolor=#ffcc00| ● || || || || || || || || || || ||
|- align=center
|align=left| Javelin throw
| || || || ||bgcolor=#ffcc00| ● || || || || || || || ||
|- align=center
|align=left| Greek discus
| || || || || ||bgcolor=#ffcc00| ● || || || || || || ||
|- align=center
|align=left| Freestyle javelin
| || ||bgcolor=#ffcc00| ● || || || || || || || || || ||
|-
! July || 13th || 14th || 15th || 16th || 17th || 18th || 19th || 20th || 21st || 22nd || 23rd || 24th || 25th

Participating nations
446 athletes from 20 nations competed. Argentina and Turkey were the only two nations not to compete in athletics.

References
 
 
 

 
1908 Summer Olympics events
1908 in athletics (track and field)
1908
International athletics competitions hosted by England
Athletics in London